Quetzal is a group of colourful birds of the trogon family found in the Americas.

Quetzal (sometimes spelled quezal) may also refer to:

 Resplendent quetzal, the best-known species
 The Resplendent Quetzal, a 1977 short-story by Margaret Atwood
 Quetzal, a character on the Dragon Tales animated series
 Quetzal (band), a music band from East Los Angeles
 Quetzal file format, a computer file format
 The Quetzal, a fictional species of half-creatures featured in The Echorium Sequence
 Guatemalan quetzal, the currency of Guatemala
 Puerto Quetzal, Guatemala's largest Pacific Ocean port
 Quantal Quetzal, a release of Ubuntu, a Linux operating system
 Quetzalcoatl, an indigenous Central Mexican creator deity
 Topiltzin Ce Acatl Quetzalcoatl, 10th century Toltec leader and mythologised figure
 El Quetzal, a municipality in the San Marcos department of Guatemala
 Quetzal Guerrero, American-born, Latin soul singer
 , species of plant
 , species of arachnid